Sahiti may refer to:

Surname 
 Naser Sahiti (* 1966), Kosovan professor and rector of the University Prishtina

Group/Caste 
Sahitis or Sahta are sub group/caste of Lohana community  Sahitis(also known as Sahitas or Sayta)  and, together with the Amils and Bhaiband, form one of the three major groups of Lohana caste in Sindh, Pakistan.

Sahitis are mostly in occupied in supplying dry fruit, general foodstuff and textiles.

References

Surnames
Lohana
Social groups of Pakistan
Sindhi people
Sindhi tribes